Mansur ibn Sarjun was a Byzantine fiscal official or governor of Damascus of local Syrian origin under emperors Maurice and Heraclius, as well as during the Persian occupation of Damascus in 614–628. He surrendered the city to the besieging Arab Muslims in 635, having first secured the safe conduct of the local inhabitants. For his role in the surrender, he was maligned in Christian circles. Mansur's family remained prominent under Muslim rule, with his son Sarjun serving as a high-ranking official in Syria under the early Umayyad caliphs and his grandson John of Damascus attaining prominence as one of the major Christian thinkers of his time.

Life
Mansur was a local Syrian of Aramean or Arab origins. His native language was likely Aramaic, though he was well-versed in Greek and likely knew Arabic as well. According to the 10th-century Melkite historian Eutychius of Alexandria, Mansur was appointed a fiscal official in Damascus by the Byzantine emperor Maurice. During this period, he continued to remit the taxes of his jurisdiction to the Sasanians. The Byzantines regained control of Damascus in 628, and two years later, when Emperor Heraclius visited the city, he had Mansur jailed and tortured to pressure him to reimburse the taxes remitted to the Sasanians. In exchange, Mansur retained his office. Eutychius claims Mansur harbored "anger" toward the Emperor as a result of this episode.

During the Muslim siege of Damascus, Mansur is mentioned in several Muslim and Christian sources as the leader of the city's inhabitants who opened negotiations with the Muslim commander Khalid ibn al-Walid. In September 635, he opened the Bab Sharqi (Eastern Gate) of the city to Khalid after the two signed a capitulation agreement, which guaranteed the safety of the city's inhabitants and properties. The safe conduct excluded the Byzantine troops defending Damascus, who subsequently fled the city. Eutychius noted that as a result of Mansur's role in the surrender, "all the patriarchs and bishops in the world anathematized him". The 9th-century Syriac historian and patriarch Dionysius of Tel Mahre also names Mansur as the city official who surrendered Damascus, but while Eutychius viewed Mansur's act as treachery, Dionysius described it as a means to secure the safety and welfare of the inhabitants.

Descendants
Mansur founded a family of high prominence in Damascus. The family remained Melkites, i.e. orthodox Christians of the imperial Byzantine rite. Mansur's son Sarjun was appointed the katib (scribe or secretary) of Mu'awiya ibn Abi Sufyan, the governor of Damascus and eventually all of Islamic Syria from  through his accession as the first Umayyad caliph in 661 and until the caliph's death in 680. Sarjun kept his office under Mu'awiya's successors Yazid I, Mu'awiya II, Marwan I and Abd al-Malik, the last of whom dismissed Sarjun around 700. Sarjun's son, John of Damascus (d. 749), was a prominent Christian thinker. Under Abbasid rule, which replaced Umayyad rule in 750, two other descendants of Mansur served as patriarchs of Jerusalem: Sergius I and Elias III.

References

Bibliography

7th-century Christians
7th-century Byzantine people
Byzantine officials
Medieval Damascus
People of the Muslim conquest of the Levant
Syrian Christians
Prisoners and detainees of the Byzantine Empire
Torture victims
Heraclius